D. indica may refer to:

 Defluviimonas indica, a species of bacterium isolated from a deep-sea hydrothermal vent
 Deroplatys indica, a species of dead leaf praying mantis
 Diaphana indica, the cucumber moth, a species of grass moth
 Dillenia indica, a species native to southeastern Asia
 Dipsas indica, the Amazonian snail-eater, a snake species found in South America
 Discradisca indica, a brachiopod species in the genus Discradisca
Dorstenia indica, a species of small plant in the mulberry family
Drimia indica, a species of flowering plant
 Drosera indica, a sundew, an insectivorous plant species native to tropical countries throughout the world

Synonyms
 Derris indica, a synonym for Pongamia pinnata
 Duchesnea indica, a synonym for Potentilla indica

See also
 Indica (disambiguation)